Lake Colorado City State Park is a 500-acre state park southwest of Colorado City in Mitchell County, Texas, United States and is administered by the Texas Parks and Wildlife Department (TPWD). Lake Colorado City State Park is located on Lake Colorado City, a reservoir on Morgan Creek, a tributary of the Colorado River. TPWD leased the land in 1971 for 99 years from a local utility company. The park opened in 1972. Between 2012 and 2014, the park averaged 7,643 visits per year. That number jumped to an average of 27,817 between 2019 and 2021, the peak years of the COVID-19 pandemic in Texas.

Nature
Lake Colorado City State Park lies in the Rolling Plains ecoregion of Texas and originally consisted mostly of grassland. Mesquite has since taken over as the dominant plant. TPWD periodically carries out a controlled burn to eliminate the mesquite and return the land to open prairie.

Flora
The most common plants in the park are prickly pear and mesquite. Many types of wildflowers make an appearance in the spring.

Animals
Mammals in the park include porcupine, gray fox, coyote, bobcat, white-tail deer, raccoon, badger and skunk. Reptiles found in the park are Texas horned lizard, Texas spiny lizard, six-lined racerunner and western diamondback rattlesnake.

More than 300 bird species have been sighted in the park. Northern mockingbird, cactus wren, mourning dove, house finch, canyon towhee, northern bobwhite, scaled quail, golden-fronted woodpecker ladder-backed woodpecker, and curve-billed thrasher can be seen in the park year-round. American coot and pied-billed grebe nest near the lake in winter.

Recreation
Activities at the park include fishing, swimming, paddleboarding, kayaking, camping, picnicking, hiking and geocaching.

References

External links

Texas Parks and Wildlife

State parks of Texas
Mitchell County, Texas
Protected areas established in 1972
1972 establishments in Texas